Niangxi Town is a town and the county seat of Xinshao County in Hunan, China. The town was originally formed as a township, reorganized as a town in 1953. It is located in the south central Xinshao County, it is bordered by Shuangqing District and Daxiang District to the south, Xintianpu Town to the west, Yantang Town to the north, Quetang Town to the north. Through the amalgamation of village-level divisions in 2016, the town has 20 villages and 11 communities under its jurisdiction, its seat is Niangxi Community.

Administrative divisions

Amalgamation of village-level divisions in 2016

References

External links
 Official Website

Xinshao County
County seats in Hunan